Fariqe Hairuman (born 10 March 1983) is a Malaysian race car driver.

BTCC

Fariqe is possibly best known as a driver for Team PETRONAS Syntium Proton (Team PSP) in the British Touring Car Championship in 2004.

ATCC
He is also known for having driven in the Asian Touring Car Championship (ATCC) (2006). He is the seasons Champion for ATCC 2007 ( Overall )

Merdeka Millennium 12 Hour Endurance Race
Fariqe has also competed in the Merdeka Millennium 12 Hour Endurance Race (Open Class) in 2002, 2003 and 2006 on Malaysia's Sepang International Circuit. In 2006, he led team PETRONAS to victory in Class C (Production cars below 1600cc) Other team members were Syahrizal Jamaluddin and Fauzi Othman.
2009 he came 2nd in MME driving the BMW Z4M with his teammate Masataka Yanagida & Nobuteru Taniguchi.
2010 DNF as the mechanical problem with the car.
2011 he was the first Malaysian to drive the Mercedes SLS GT3 in the world. As the result in MMER 2011 he came 3rd overall. Lead for 10 hours of the race before a mechanical problem on the front wheel.
2012 2nd overall with the Mercedes SLS GT3.

Super Taikyu
2007 he competed in the Super Taikiyu in Japan, driving his new car, the BMW Z4M with Japanese driver Masataka Yanagida.
2008 finished 2nd in the championship.
2009 1st in championship.

Personal life
Fariqe is married and lives in Johor, Malaysia. His personal car is a Mitsuoka Zero One. Formerly, he drove an Alfa Romeo 145. He often participates in drives with ItaliaAuto Club Malaysia.

Racing record

Complete British Touring Car Championship results
(key) (Races in bold indicate pole position - 1 point awarded in first race) (Races in italics indicate fastest lap - 1 point awarded all races) (* signifies that driver lead race for at least one lap - 1 point awarded all races)

TCR Spa 500 results

2019:

- TCR Spa 500 1st in Pro-Am

- Sepang 1000km Champion

- Malaysia Touring car Champion

2018:

- Sepang 1000km Champion

2017:

- Sepang 1000km 

2015:

· Malaysian Touring Car Champion

2014:

· Sepang 1000 km debut
-Qualified 3rd
-DNF

2013:

•Super Taikyu Endurance Series ~ 2nd
· 1st race driver to win in newly open Inje Speedway (Korea)

2012:

•Malaysia Merdeka Endurance Series 2012 ~ 2nd Overall 
•Super Taikyu Endurance Series ~ Champion

2011:

•Malaysia Merdeka Endurance Series 2011 ~ 2nd Overall
•Super Taikyu Endurance Series ~ 2nd

2010:

•Dunlop 24Hours Dubai ~ Class winner, 2nd overall
•Super Taikyu Endurance Series ~ Champion

2009:

• Full season Super Taikyu Endurance Series ~ 2nd overall.
• PETRONAS Primax 3 Merdeka Millenium Endurance Race ~ 2nd overall.

2008:

• Full season Super Taikyu Endurance Series Champion , winner 24-hours of Tokachi ~ 2nd overall Champion in class ST1

2007:

• Full season in the 2007 ATCS ~ Overall Champion Drivers’ championship; 2nd Overall Team Championship 
• Debuted in the Super Taikyu Endurance Series ~ 5th position overall; 3 Pole positions; 1 x second-place finish; 1 x third-place finish
• PETRONAS Primax 3 Merdeka Millennium Endurance Race ~ Led for 11 hours, DNF (Class O)
• Full season in the 2006 ATCC, 2nd Overall ATCC Drivers' Championship, 4 x second-place finishes, 5 x third places finishes, Overall Team Championship award
•Class C winner in the 2006 PETRONAS Primax 3 Merdeka Millennium Endurance Race

2005:

• Full season in the 2005 ATCC ~ 2nd Overall ATCC Drivers Championship; Two Race wins; Eight 2nd Place finishes
• Merdeka Millennium Endurance Race

2004:

• Debuted in the 2004 British Touring Car Championship
• Merdeka Millennium Endurance Race ~ 3rd Overall in Class (Class C)

2003:

• New Zealand 8-hours Endurance Race, 1st place
• New Zealand 4-hours Endurance Race – DNF
• New Zealand 6-hours Endurance Race, 1st place
• ATCC Round Sepang, 4th place
• Merdeka Millennium 12-hour Endurance Race
• Began Circuit acclimatisation programme, UK

2002:

• Johor Race Series, 1st place
• ATCC Round Johor, 2nd-place finish
• ATCC Round Sepang, 4th place
• Merdeka Millennium 12-hour Endurance race

2001:

• Intensive Training at Mansfield Circuit, New Zealand
• May - Debut in the Johor Race Series, 5th-place finish
• ATCC Round Shah Alam, 2nd-place finish
• ATCC Round Sepang, 4th-place finish

References

External links
 Official website
 Team Petronas Motorsport website

1983 births
British Touring Car Championship drivers
Living people
Malaysian Muslims
Malaysian people of Malay descent
Malaysian racing drivers
Asian Touring Car Championship drivers
Engstler Motorsport drivers